Tanya Ashken (born 1939 in London, England) is a New Zealand silversmith and sculptor. She was one of a number of European-trained jewellers who came to New Zealand in the 1960s and transformed contemporary jewellery in that country, including Jens Hoyer Hansen, Kobi Bosshard and Gunter Taemmler.

Ashken attended the Central School of Arts and Crafts in London, where she was awarded a diploma in silversmithing in 1960, and also studied sculpture at the Atelier de Del Debbio in Paris the following year. She began making jewellery in semi-precious materials in 1962. She does not draw a distinction between her jewellery and her sculpture: “her jewellery is small sculpture that can be worn.”

Ashken married New Zealand artist John Drawbridge (1930–2005) in 1960 and emigrated to New Zealand in 1963. In 1966 her work was included in Recent New Zealand Sculpture at the Auckland City Art Gallery.

In 1967 Ashken was the second artist to be awarded the Frances Hodgkins Fellowship, an opportunity for her to spend a year in Dunedin developing ideas for large sculptures. After this Ashken attracted a number of major commissions, including Seabird V (1974) for the New Zealand High Commission in Canberra and her best-known work, the water sculpture Albatross (1986) in Frank Kitts Park, Wellington. This was a first commission for the Wellington Sculpture Trust. Hone Tuwhare wrote a poem to mark the occasion. Ashken said she got the idea for the Albatross sculpture while walking along a beach in Island Bay and seeing waves crashing around rocks.

Art historian Anne Kirker describes Ashken's sculpture as “graceful organic forms articulated by the play of natural light”, and notes the  evocation of “weathered stone or the graceful movements of seabirds – familiar components of her Island Bay home in Wellington“.

References

1939 births
20th-century New Zealand sculptors
21st-century New Zealand sculptors
20th-century New Zealand women artists
21st-century New Zealand women artists
New Zealand women sculptors
English emigrants to New Zealand
New Zealand expatriates in England
New Zealand silversmiths
People from Wellington City
Living people
Women metalsmiths